A Macedonian Argentine is an Argentine citizen of Macedonian descent, who resides in Argentina. Most of Macedonian Argentines are descendants of ethnic Macedonians from North Macedonia. Argentina is home to one of the largest Macedonian communities in the Americas. 

Many Macedonian Argentines are the descendants of the "pečalbari" (seasonal workers) who came to Argentina in the early 20th century. Many decided to stay in the country, setting up Macedonian colonies in the Pampas and other regions. Most Macedonians can be found in Buenos Aires, the Pampas and Córdoba. An estimated 30,000 Macedonians live in Argentina.

References

See also
 Ethnic Macedonians
 Macedonian diaspora

 
European Argentine
Argentine